Cross Gates and Whinmoor is an electoral ward of Leeds City Council in east Leeds, West Yorkshire, covering the outer city suburb areas of Cross Gates, Manston, Swarcliffe and Whinmoor. Austhorpe is also shared with Temple Newsam ward to the south.

Councillors 

 indicates seat up for re-election.
 indicates seat up for election following resignation or death of sitting councillor.
 indicates councillor defection.
* indicates incumbent councillor.

Elections since 2010

May 2022

May 2021

May 2019

May 2018

May 2016

May 2015

May 2014

May 2013 by-election

May 2012

May 2011

May 2010

See also
Listed buildings in Leeds (Cross Gates and Whinmoor Ward)

Notes

References

Wards of Leeds